Announced at the Mobile World Congress during February 2009, the X960 is one of Acer’s first five mobile phones, labelled the Acer Tempo Smartphone Series.

The X960 is a 3.5G quad-band Windows Mobile device with a 2.8-inch, 640 x 480 touch screen, which is operated via a stylus, and a five-way navigation button. It uses Acer’s Easy Keyboard to enable messaging, while more generally the interface uses the Acer 2.0 software

The device has a 3.2MP autofocus rear mounted camera with flash, and a front-facing VGA camera for video calls. Location-based services are provided by SiRFstarIII GPS. Talk time is up to six hours, while standby is up to 275 hours. The Windows Mobile 6.1 Professional software suite includes access to the Outlook Mobile email client, as well as mobile versions of Internet Explorer, MSN Messenger, Windows Live and Windows Media Player 10.

The X960 launched at around £300/€350 (excluding tax) in Europe, the Middle East, and Asia.

References

External links 
Acer's smartphone website
Official X960 website

Windows Mobile Professional devices
X960
Mobile phones introduced in 2009